Tord Nänzén (born 23 August 1954) is a retired Swedish ice hockey player. Nänzén was born in Timra, Sweden and was part of the Djurgården Swedish champions' team of 1983. Nänzén made 247 Elitserien appearances for Djurgården.

References

Swedish ice hockey players
Djurgårdens IF Hockey players
1954 births
Living people